Orbicular is an adjective meaning "circular" and may specifically refer to:

 Orbicular leaf, a plant leaf shape
 Orbicularis oculi muscle, a muscle around the eye
 Orbicularis oris muscle, a muscle around the mouth
 Orbicular batfish, a species of fish
 Caracanthus, the orbicular velvet fishes
 Orbicular granite, a rock type
 Orbicular jasper, a variety of jasper
 Orbicular stigma, a spot on wings of certain moths